Prescription for Romance is a 1937 American romantic comedy film directed by S. Sylvan Simon for Universal Pictures. It stars Wendy Barrie, Kent Taylor, and Frank Jenks.

Plot

Cast

 Wendy Barrie as Valarie Barry
 Kent Taylor as Steve Macy
 Frank Jenks as Smitty
 Mischa Auer as Count Sandor
 Gregory Gaye as Dr. Paul Azarny
 Dorothea Kent as Lola Kent
 Henry Hunter as Kenneth Barton
 Samuel S. Hinds as Major Goddard
 Frank Reicher as Jozeph
 Ted Osborne as Corney
 Bert Roach as Police Sergeant
 Christian Rub as Conductor
 George Cleveland as Cab Driver (uncredited)
 Franco Corsaro as Headwaiter Franz (uncredited)
 Joe Cunningham as Farrell (uncredited)
 Sidney D'Albrook as Cab Driver (uncredited)
 Robert Fischer as Veterinary (uncredited)
 Otto Fries as Police Sergeant (uncredited)
 Frederick Giermann as Ambulance Driver (uncredited)
 William Gould as Doorman (uncredited)
 Dorothy Granger as Cashier (uncredited)
 Elsa Janssen as Elsa (uncredited)
 Jimmie Lucas as Waiter (uncredited)
 William Lundigan as Officer (uncredited)
 Michael Mark as Cab Driver (uncredited)
 Greta Meyer as Marie (Head Nurse) (uncredited)
 Torben Meyer as Hotel Desk Clerk (uncredited)
 Constance Moore as Girl (uncredited)
 Paul Newlan as Bearded Hungarian (uncredited)
 Alexander Palasthy as Hungarian Roue (uncredited)
 Ralph Sanford as Hungarian Policeman (uncredited)
 Hugh Sheridan as Feodor (uncredited)
 Paul Weigel as Peasant (uncredited)
 Dick Wessel as Sailor (uncredited)
 Dan Wolheim as Policeman (uncredited)

References

External links

1937 films
American romantic comedy films
1937 romantic comedy films
Films directed by S. Sylvan Simon
Universal Pictures films
American black-and-white films
1930s English-language films
1930s American films